Baeda may refer to several Emperors of Ethiopia:
Atse Baeda Maryam (1787–1788) 
Baeda Maryam of Ethiopia (1448–1478), nəgusä nägäst of Ethiopia, and member of the Solomonic dynasty
Baeda Maryam II of Ethiopia, nəgusä nägäst April – December 1795 of Ethiopia
Baeda Maryam III of Ethiopia, nəgusä nägäst of Ethiopia for a few days in April 1826

It can also refer to Bede, a 7th-century Northumbrian monk